Henry Albert Hartland (2 August 1840 – 28 November 1893 aged 53) was an Irish artist known for his watercolours and landscape paintings.

Early period
His family were nurserymen, and at the time of his birth were based in Mallow.  His brother William Baylor Hartland was a well known plantsman.  His family later moved to Cork where he studied at the Cork School of Art. Some of his watercolours were signed Albert Hartland.

Career
After leaving Art College he worked as an illustrator for a Cork bookseller and later built theatrical scenery in Cork and Dublin. He was the uncle of illustrator Gertrude Hartland.

References

1840 births
1893 deaths
19th-century Irish painters
Irish male painters
19th-century Irish male artists